The Joint Medical Store (JMS), is a non-government organisation in Uganda, mandated to procure, store and distribute human medication and health-related consumable items to health units. It is owned by the Uganda Catholic Medical Bureau and the Uganda Protestant Medical Bureau, the two entities who own the NGO.

Location
The headquarters of the JMS are located at 1828 Gogonya Road, in Nsambya, in the Makindye Division of Kampala, Uganda's capital and oldest city.

The organization maintains a branch office and  warehouse at 24 Ruharo-Bushenyi Road in the city of Mbarara, in the Western Region of Uganda. Their third office and warehouse are located at Block 3, Ragem Road, Arua City, in West Nile sub-region, in the Northern Region of Uganda.

Plans are underway to establish branch offices and warehouses in Gulu, and Mbale. In August 2022 JMS broke ground on a  building to house the warehouse of their Gulu branch. Construction is expected to last about one year at a budgeted cost of UGX:7 billion (approx. US$2 million).

Overview
JMS is a joint venture company, created in 1979 by the Uganda Catholic Medical Bureau and the Uganda Protestant Medical Bureau. JMS operates as a non-profit, Corporate body registered under the Trustees Incorporation Act Cap 165. JMS procures, stores and distributes human medication and related healthcare equipment and supplies to the hospitals and health facilities in the private non-profit health sector.

JMS offers free installation, servicing and maintenance on equipment purchased from JMS or any of their authorized distributor. In December 2017, they began manufacturing nutritional supplements, clinical oxygen and medical sundries.

Governance
The organization is governed by a board of trustees and a board of directors. The day-to-day operations of JMS are managed by a 15-person management team, led by Bildard Baguma, the executive director.

See also
 Uganda National Medical Stores
 National Food and Drug Authority
 Quality Chemical Industries Limited

References

External links

JMS decries low quality medicines on Ugandan market As of 4 February 2019.

Organizations established in 1979
Organisations based in Kampala
1979 establishments in Uganda
Medical and health organisations based in Uganda